Sudhir Dalvi is an Indian actor. He first came to prominence for portraying Guru Vashishta in Ramanand Sagar's TV series Ramayan and is well known for his role as Sai Baba. He also acted as Sai Baba in Manoj Kumar's feature film Shirdi Ke Sai Baba which is a milestone role in Bollywood. He also became famous for his role in TV series Kyunki Saas Bhi Kabhi Bahu Thi.

He played Nana Nagarkar in a famous tele show of the 1990s, Junoon.

He also appeared in Shyam Benegal's TV Series Bharat Ek Khoj as elderly Shah Jahan in the Aurangzeb episodes.

Filmography

Television

External links
Filmography

Marathi people
20th-century Indian male actors
Indian male television actors
Living people
Male actors from Mumbai
1939 births
Male actors in Hindi cinema
Actors from Mumbai